Eulalia Soldevila Vall (25 July 1933 – 12 September 1979) better known as Laly Soldevila was a Spanish film actress. She appeared in 100 films between 1955 and 1979.

Selected filmography
 You and Me Are Three (1962)
 La gran familia (1962)
 The Troublemaker (1963)
Forty Degrees in the Shade (1967)
 Long Live the Bride and Groom (1970)
 Growing Leg, Diminishing Skirt (1970)
 La descarriada (1973) as Marga

External links

1933 births
1979 deaths
Actresses from Barcelona
Spanish film actresses
Deaths from cancer in Spain
20th-century Spanish actresses